The National Council for Fire & Emergency Services (formerly the Australasian Fire and Emergency Service Authorities Council or AFAC), is the peak body responsible for representing fire, emergency services and land management agencies in the Australasian region. It was formed in 1993 and has 34 full members and 13 affiliate members.

Members
AFAC Members are drawn from every state and territory in Australia and New Zealand and from around the Pacific. Full members for the AFAC council and Affiliate members still have access to the support and knowledge network of AFAC without holding a seat on the AFAC council. The current member list is as follows:

Full members (AFAC Council)

Australia 

 Airservices Australia

Australian Capital Territory 

 ACT Emergency Services Agency 
 ACT Parks and Conservation Service

New South Wales 

 Fire and Rescue NSW
 Forests NSW
 NSW Rural Fire Service
 NSW State Emergency Service
 Department of Planning, Industry and Environment

Northern Territory 

 Bushfires NT
 Northern Territory Emergency Service
 Northern Territory Fire and Rescue Service

Queensland 

 Department of Environment and Resource Management
 Emergency Management Queensland
 Queensland Fire and Emergency Services

South Australia 

 Department of Environment and Water 
 South Australian Forestry Corporation (trading as Forestry SA)
 South Australian Country Fire Service 
 South Australian Metropolitan Fire Service
 South Australian State Emergency Service

Tasmania 

 Forestry Tasmania
 Tasmania Parks and Wildlife Service
 State Emergency Service Tasmania
 Tasmania Fire Service

Victoria 

 Country Fire Authority (CFA)
 Department of Environment, Land, Water and Planning
 Fire Rescue Victoria (FRV)
 Parks Victoria
 Victoria State Emergency Service

Western Australia 

 Department of Parks and Wildlife (Western Australia)
 DFES State Emergency Service
 Department of Fire and Emergency Services

New Zealand 

 Fire and Emergency New Zealand

Affiliate members 

 Attorney-General's Department (Australia)
 Australasian Road Rescue Organisation (ARRO)
 Bureau of Meteorology
 CSIRO Forestry & Forest Products
 Department of Conservation (New Zealand)
 EMQUAL
 Forestry Plantations Queensland
 Hong Kong Fire Services Department
 Melbourne Water
 Office of the Fire Services Commissioner Victoria
 Pacific Islands Fire Service Association (PIFSA)
 Papua New Guinea Fire Service
 South Australian Fire and Emergency Services Commission (SAFECOM)

AFAC Knowledge Web 
'The AFAC Knowledge Web was an initiative born out of the Bushfire CRC's Fire Knowledge Network project. That project aimed to bring together the broad spectrum of research, both within the CRC and from researchers in other organisations, together with local knowledge, and lessons from history.

A joint partnership between the Bushfire CRC and AFAC, this concept was expanded to draw in the operational knowledge of fire, land management and emergency service organisations in Australia and New Zealand, creating an online source of knowledge and sharing for the industry.'

It was launched on 1 September 2008 at the Annual AFAC Bushfire CRC Conference.

Members of the public are able to access a wide range of content such as research reports, case studies and AFAC news articles.  Membership of the Knowledge Web is currently only open to volunteers and staff of AFAC member agencies and key research partners.

References

External links
 AFAC Official site
AFAC Conference
 AFAC Knowledge Web
 Bushfire Cooperative Research Centre
Australian Institute for Disaster Resilience
Emergency Management Professionalisation Scheme
National Emergency Services Memorial
Home Fire Sprinkler Coalition Australia
National Aerial Firefighting Centre

Fire and rescue services of Australia
1993 establishments in Australia
Fire protection
Emergency services
Civil defense